The "Fünf Stücke für Streichquartett" or "Five Pieces for String Quartet" is a suite of five musical pieces by Czech composer Erwin Schulhoff.  The work contains stylistic connections to both a baroque dance suite and to other pieces composed by the Second Viennese School. The piece premiered on 8 August 1924 at the International Society for New Music Festival in Salzburg, and was dedicated to Darius Milhaud.

Structure
Each of the pieces evokes a different style of dance music:
Piece 1: Viennese Waltz
Piece 2: Serenade
Piece 3: Czech folk music
Piece 4: Tango
Piece 5: Tarantella

Reception
Robin Holloway described the work as a "parody and debunking", similar to later works by Aaron Copland and Benjamin Britten.

References 

Compositions by Erwin Schulhoff
Compositions for string quartet
1924 compositions
Dada
Suites (music)

External links